The Fighting Demon is a 1925 American silent melodrama film. Directed by Arthur Rosson, the film stars Richard Talmadge, Lorraine Eason, and Dick Sutherland. It was released on May 24, 1925.

Plot
As described in a film magazine review, John Drake, athlete and bank vault designer, travels to South America to accept a position. He meets Dynamite Díaz and his bride and helps the prize fighter train. The bride flirts, causing Díaz to become enraged and to administer a beating to Drake. Arriving in South America, Drake discovers that the position was a hoax used by a criminal gang to get Drake to reveal a method of entering a bank vault that he had designed. He refuses and the crooks steal all is valuables in an effort to obtain his aid. To get funds to live, he is persuaded to fight the champion. Dolores is told by the leader of the crooks that Drake is not to be trusted. At the fight, Drake is punished for two rounds when he remembers a punch used by the fighter Díaz had told him was always disastrous to him. Drake uses it and the fight is over. The leader of the gang tells Drake and Dolores that her father, the president of the bank, is locked in his own vault. Drake goes to open it, and is hit on the head by the crooks. The gang is captured when an apparatus Drake designed sounds an alarm. Drake and Dolores are happy and he becomes a teller at the bank.

Cast list

References

External links

American silent feature films
American black-and-white films
Silent American drama films
1925 drama films
Melodrama films
1925 films
Film Booking Offices of America films
Films directed by Arthur Rosson
1920s American films